Quirinus Henricus Franciscus "Quirin" Vrehen (born 25 February 1932) is a Dutch physicist. He served as head physicist of the Philips Natuurkundig Laboratorium.

Vrehen was born in 's-Hertogenbosch. He obtained a PhD in physics from Utrecht University in 1963 with a thesis on electron spin resonance and optical studies of solids. From 1963 to 1966 he worked in the United States at the MIT National Magnetic Laboratory. At the institute he worked on magneto-optical experiments on semiconductors. Vrehen then returned to the Netherlands and started working at the Philips Natuurkundig Laboratorium.

Vrehen was elected member of the Royal Netherlands Academy of Arts and Sciences in 1988.

References

1932 births
Living people
20th-century Dutch physicists
Members of the Royal Netherlands Academy of Arts and Sciences
People from 's-Hertogenbosch
Utrecht University alumni